The following is a list of individuals associated with Humboldt University of Berlin through attending as a student, or serving as a member of the faculty or staff. As of October 2020, the university has been associated with 57 Nobel Prize winners (including former students, faculty and researchers)

 Bozorg Alavi (1904–1997), novelist and writer
 Alexander Altmann (1906–1987), rabbi and scholar of Jewish philosophy and mysticism
 Gerhard Anschütz (1867–1948), leading jurisprudent and "father of the constitution" of the state of Hesse
 Jörg Baberowski (born 1961), professor of eastern European history
 Michelle Bachelet (born 1951), pediatrician and epidemiologist, president of the Republic of Chile
 Azmi Bishara (born 1956), Arab-Israeli politician
 Bruno Bauer (1809–1882), theologian, Bible critic and philosopher
 Jurek Becker (1937–1997), writer (Jacob the Liar)
 Max Bergmann (1886–1944), biochemist
 Inke Siewert (1980), professor of inorganic chemistry at University of Göttingen
 Eliezer Berkovits (1908–1992), rabbi, philosopher and theologian
 Willibald Beyschlag (1823-1900), theologian, publisher
 Algernon Sydney Biddle (1847-1891), American lawyer and law professor at the University of Pennsylvania Law School
 Otto von Bismarck (1815–1898), first German chancellor
 Dietrich Bonhoeffer (1906–1945), theologian and resistance fighter
 Beatrix Borchard, (born 1950), musicologist
Louis Borchardt, (1816/17-1883), paediatrician
 Max Born (1882–1970), physicist, Nobel Prize for physics in 1954
 Siegfried Borris (1906–1987), composer, musicologist and music educator
 Aron Brand (1910–1977), pediatric cardiologist
 Rudolf Brandt (1909–1948), Nazi SS officer, executed for war crimes
 Gottlieb Burckhardt (1836–1907), psychiatrist, first physician to perform modern psychosurgery (1888)
 Michael C. Burda, macroeconomist
 Ezriel Carlebach (1909–1956), Israeli journalist and editorial writer
 Ernst Cassirer (1874–1945), philosopher
 Adelbert von Chamisso (1781–1838), natural scientist and writer
 Ramesh Chennamaneni (born 1956), Indian politician
 Georg von Dadelsen (1918–2007), musicologist, Neue Bach-Ausgabe
 Angela Davis (born 1944), political activist, educator, author, philosopher
 Gustav Adolf Deissmann (1866-1937), theologian, New Testament Greek philologist, author, Nobel nominee
 Suat Derviş (1904/1905–1972), Turkish novelist, journalist, and political activist
 Harilal Dhruv (1856–1896), Indian lawyer, poet, indologist
 Hermann Alexander Diels, (1848-1922), classical scholar 
 Wilhelm Dilthey (1833–1911), philosopher
 Georg Dohrn, conductor
 W. E. B. Du Bois (1868–1963), African-American activist and scholar
 William Duane (1872-1935), physicist
 Benedykt Dybowski (1833-1930), zoologist, pioneer of Limnology
 Paul Ehrlich (1854–1915), physician, Nobel Prize for medicine in 1908
 Albert Einstein (1879–1955), physicist, Nobel Prize for physics in 1921
 Gotthold Eisenstein (1823–1852), mathematician, specialized in number theory and analysis
 Friedrich Engels (1820–1895), journalist and philosopher
 Annemarie Esche, scholar of Burmese literature
 Ludwig Andreas Feuerbach (1804–1872), philosopher
 Johann Gottlieb Fichte (1762–1814), philosopher, rector of the university (1810–1812)
 Horst Fischer (1912–1966), SS concentration camp doctor executed for war crimes
 Emil Fischer (1852–1919), founder of modern biochemistry, Nobel Prize in chemistry in 1902
 Bruno Flierl (b. 1927), architect and city planner
 Werner Forßmann (1904–1979), physician, Nobel Prize for medicine in 1956
 James Franck (1882–1964), physicist, Nobel Prize for physics in 1925
 Wilhelm Frick (1877-1946), Nazi official, executed for war crimes
 Karl Gebhardt (1897–1948), Nazi SS physician who conducted criminal medical experiments; executed for war crimes
 Ernst Gehrcke (1878–1960), experimental physicist
 Jacob Grimm (1785–1863), linguist and literary critic
 Wilhelm Grimm (1786–1859), linguist and literary critic
 Gregor Gysi (1948–), German politician and lawyer
 Fritz Haber (1868–1934), chemist, Nobel Prize for chemistry in 1918
 Otto Hahn (1879–1968), chemist, Nobel Prize for chemistry in 1944
 Sir William Reginald Halliday (1886–1966), principal of King's College London (1928–1952)
 Robert Havemann (1910–1982), chemist, co-founder of European Union, and leading GDR dissident
 Adolf von Harnack (1851-1930), theologian, educator, academic administrator
 Georg Wilhelm Friedrich Hegel (1770–1831), philosopher, rector of the university (1830–1831)
 Heinrich Heine (1797–1856), writer and poet
 Reinhart Heinrich (1946–2006), pioneer in systems biology
 Werner Heisenberg (1901–1976), physicist, Nobel Prize for physics in 1932
 Dieter Helm (1941–2022), farmer and politician
 Hermann von Helmholtz (1821–1894), physician and physicist
 Gustav Hertz (1887–1975), physicist, Nobel Prize for physics in 1925
 Paula Hertwig (1889–1983), biologist, politician
 Heinrich Hertz (1857–1894), physicist
 Abraham Joshua Heschel (1907–1972) rabbi, philosopher, and theologian
 Jacobus Henricus van 't Hoff (1852–1911), chemist, Nobel Prize for chemistry in 1901
 Johanna Hellman (1889–1982), surgeon
 Wassily Hoeffding (1914–1991), statistician who introduced U-statistic and known for Hoeffding's inequality
 Max Huber (1874–1960), international lawyer and diplomat
 Christoph Wilhelm Hufeland (1762–1836), founder of macrobiotics
 Wilhelm von Humboldt (1767–1835), politician, linguist, and founder of the university
 Alexander von Humboldt (1769–1859), natural scientist
 Zakir Hussain (1897–1969), third president of India
 Yitzchok Hutner American Orthodox rabbi and rosh yeshiva (dean)
 Sadi Irmak (1904–1990), Prime minister of Turkey
 Elisabeth Jastrow (1890–1981), German-born American classical archaeologist
 Hermann Kasack (1896–1966), writer
 George F. Kennan (1904–2005), American diplomat, political scientist and historian
 Gustav Kirchhoff (1824–1887), physicist
 Philip Klein (1849–1926), rabbi
 Paul Alfred Kleinert, German writer, editor and translator
 Wilhelm Knabe (1923–2021), German ecologist, pacifist, civil servant and politician
 Robert Koch (1843–1910), physician, Nobel Prize for medicine in 1905
 Komitas Vardapet (1869–1935) Armenian priest, composer, ethnomusicologist, music pedagogue, singer, choirmaster and the founder of the Armenian classical music.
 Albrecht Kossel (1853–1927), physician, Nobel Prize for medicine in 1910
 Arnold Kutzinski (died 1956), psychiatrist
 Edmund Landau (1877–1938), mathematician
 Arnold von Lasaulx (1839–1886) mineralogist and petrographer
 Max von Laue (1879–1960), physicist, Nobel Prize for physics in 1914
 Yeshayahu Leibowitz (1903–1994), Israeli public intellectual and polymath
 Nechama Leibowitz Israeli Bible scholar
 Wassily Leontief (1905–1999), economist, Nobel Prize for economics in 1973
 James Lewin  (1887-1937), physician and psychiatrist
 Karl Liebknecht (1871–1919), socialist politician and revolutionary
 Friedrich Loeffler (1852–1915), bacteriologist
 Ram Manohar Lohia (1910–1967), Indian activist and politician
 Karl Adolf Lorenz (1837–1923), composer
 Ivan Lysiak Rudnytsky (1919–1984), Ukrainian-Canadian historian, political scientist, publicist
 Andreas Maercker, (born 1960), clinical psychologist
 Judah Leon Magnes, rabbi, Chancellor/President of the Hebrew University of Jerusalem, 1925-1948
 Herbert Marcuse (1898–1979), philosopher
 Karl Marx (1818–1883), philosopher and sociologist
 Ernst Mayr (1904–2005), biologist
 Benjamin Mazar (1906–1995), President of Hebrew University of Jerusalem
 Joachim Mrugowsky (1905–1948), Nazi doctor executed for war crimes
 Lise Meitner (1878–1968), physicist, Enrico Fermi Award in 1966
 Felix Mendelssohn (1809–1847), composer
 Eilhard Mitscherlich (1794–1863), German chemist
 Theodor Mommsen (1817–1903), historian, Nobel Prize for literature in 1902
 Edmund Montgomery (1835–1911), philosopher, scientist, physician
 John von Neumann (1903–1957), mathematician and physicist
 Max Planck (1858–1947), physicist, Nobel Prize for physics in 1918
 Gordon Prange (1910–1980), American historian
 Leopold von Ranke (1795–1886), historian
 Otto Friedrich Ranke (1899–1959), physiologist
 Ingeborg Rapoport (1912-2017), paediatrician
 Samuel Mitja Rapoport (1912–2004), biochemist, leading scientist in the German Democratic Republic
 Tom Rapoport (born 1947), biochemist 
 Adolph Moses Radin (1848–1909), rabbi 
 Erich Regener (1881–1955), physicist
 Robert Remak (1815–1865), cell biologist
 Ludwig Scheeffer (1859–1885), mathematician
 Friedrich Wilhelm Joseph Schelling (1775–1854), philosopher
 Friedrich Daniel Ernst Schleiermacher (1768–1834), philosopher
 Moritz Schlick (1882-1936), philosopher
 Bernhard Schlink (born 1944), writer, Der Vorleser (The Reader)
 Annette Schmiedchen (born 1966), Indologist and Padma Shri award winner
 Carl Schmitt (1888–1985), German jurist, political theorist, and professor of law
 Menachem Mendel Schneerson (1902–1994), rabbi, philosopher, theologian, engineer, educator and writer
 Edith Schönert-Geiß (1933-2012), numismatist
 Arthur Schopenhauer (1788–1860), philosopher
 Erwin Schrödinger (1887–1961), physicist, Nobel Prize for physics in 1933
 Peter Schubert (1938–2003), diplomat and albanologist
 Stepan Shahumyan (1878–1918), Armenian communist politician and head of the Baku Commune
 Georg Simmel (1858–1918), philosopher and sociologist
 Joseph B. Soloveitchik (1903–1993), rabbi, philosopher, and theologian
 Herman Smith-Johannsen (1875–1987), sportsman who introduced cross-country skiing to North America
 Werner Sombart (1863–1941), philosopher, sociologist and economist
 Hans Spemann (1869–1941), biologist, Nobel Prize for biology in 1935
 Margot Sponer (1898–1945), philologist and resistance fighter
 Hermann Stieve (1886–1952), anatomist who did research on bodies of Nazi execution victims
 Max Stirner (1806–1856), philosopher
 Yemima Tchernovitz-Avidar (1909–98), Israeli author
 Gustav Tornier (1859–1938), paleontologist and zoologist
 Kurt Tucholsky (1890–1935), writer and journalist
 Luis Villar Borda (1929–2008), Colombian politician and diplomat
 Rudolf Virchow (1821–1902), physician and politician
 Filip Neriusz Walter (1810–1847), Polish organic chemist
 Max Weber (1864–1920), sociologist, philosopher, and political economist
 Alfred Wegener (1880–1930), scientist, geologist, and meteorologist, early theorist of continental drift
 Karl Weierstraß (1815–1897), mathematician
 Max Westenhöfer (1871–1957), pathologist, proposed the Aquatic ape hypothesis, reformer of field of pathology in Chile
 Stephan Westmann (1893–1964), Professor of Obstetrics and Gynaecology
 Wilhelm Heinrich Westphal (1882–1978), physicist
 Wilhelm Wien (1864–1928), physicist, Nobel Prize for physics in 1911
 Ulrich von Wilamowitz-Moellendorff (1848–1931), philologist
 Ernest Julius Wilczynski (1876–1932), mathematician
 Richard Willstätter (1872–1942), chemist, Nobel Prize for chemistry in 1915
 Shlomo Wolbe Orthodox Rabbi and author of the Alei Shur
Leonidas Zervas (1902–1980), Greek organic chemist

Nobel Prize laureates 
There are 57 Nobel Prize winners affiliated with the Humboldt University:

 1901 Jacobus Henricus van 't Hoff (Chemistry)
 1901 Emil Adolf von Behring (Physiology or Medicine)
 1902 Hermann Emil Fischer (Chemistry)
 1902 Theodor Mommsen (Literature)
 1905 Philipp Lenard (Physics)
 1905 Adolf von Baeyer (Chemistry)
 1905 Robert Koch (Physiology or Medicine)
 1907 Albert Abraham Michelson (Physics)
 1907 Eduard Buchner (Chemistry)
 1908 Rudolf Eucken (Literature)
 1908 Paul Ehrlich (Physiology or Medicine)
 1909 Auguste Beernaert (Peace)
 1909 Karl Ferdinand Braun (Physics)
 1910 Paul Heyse (Literature)
 1910 Otto Wallach (Chemistry)
 1910 Albrecht Kossel (Physiology or Medicine)
 1911 Wilhelm Wien (Physics)
 1912 Gerhart Hauptmann (Literature)
 1914 Max von Laue (Physics)
 1914 Theodore William Richards (Chemistry)
 1915 Richard Willstätter (Chemistry)
 1918 Fritz Haber (Chemistry)
 1918 Max Planck (Physics)
 1920 Walther Nernst (Chemistry)
 1921 Albert Einstein (Physics)
 1922 Otto Meyerhof (Physiology or Medicine)
 1923 Fritz Pregl (Chemistry)
 1925 Gustav Ludwig Hertz (Physics)
 1925 Austen Chamberlain (Peace)
 1925 James Franck (Physics)
 1925 Richard Adolf Zsigmondy (Chemistry)
 1926 Gustav Stresemann (Peace)
 1927 Heinrich Wieland (Chemistry)
 1928 Adolf Otto Reinhold Windaus (Chemistry)
 1929 Hans von Euler-Chelpin (Chemistry)
 1930 Hans Fischer (Chemistry)
 1931 Otto Heinrich Warburg (Physiology or Medicine)
 1931 Friedrich Bergius (Chemistry)
 1932 Werner Heisenberg (Physics)
 1933 Erwin Schrödinger (Physics)
 1935 Hans Spemann (Physiology or Medicine)
 1936 Peter Debye (Chemistry)
 1939 Adolf Butenandt (Chemistry)
 1944 Otto Hahn (Chemistry)
 1945 Ernst Boris Chain (Physiology or Medicine)
 1949 Walter R. Hess (Physiology or Medicine)
 1950 Kurt Alder (Chemistry)
 1950 Otto Diels (Chemistry)
 1953 Fritz Albert Lipmann (Physiology or Medicine)
 1953 Hans Adolf Krebs (Physiology or Medicine)
 1954 Max Born (Physics)
 1954 Walther Bothe (Physics)
 1956 Werner Forssmann (Physiology or Medicine)
 1963 Eugene Wigner (Physics)
 1969 Odd Hassel (Chemistry)
 1973 Wassily Leontief (Economics)
 1991 Bert Sakmann (Physiology or Medicine)
 2020 Emmanuelle Charpentier (Chemistry)

References